Shrimad Rajchandra (11 November 1867 – 9 April 1901) was a Jain poet, mystic, philosopher, scholar and reformer. Born in Vavaniya, a village near Morbi, he claimed to have recollection of his past lives at the age of seven. He performed Avadhāna, a memory retention and recollection test that gained him popularity, but he later discouraged it in favour of his spiritual pursuits. He wrote much philosophical poetry including Atma Siddhi. He also wrote many letters and commentaries and translated some religious texts. He is best known for his teachings on Jainism and his spiritual guidance to Mahatma Gandhi.

Early life

Shrimad Rajchandra was born on 11 November 1867 (Kartika Purnima, Vikram Samvat 1924), in Vavaniya, a port near Morbi (now in Gujarat, India). His mother, Devbai, was Svetambara Sthanakvasi Jain and his father, Ravjibhai Mehta and paternal grandfather, Panchan Mehta, were Vaishnava Hindu. So he was introduced to Jainism and Hinduism from early life. He was initiated in Vaishnavism by a Sadhu named Ramadasji. He continued to study other Indian religions and was attracted to Ahimsa (non-violence) doctrine of Jainism. Later he chose Jainism because he considered that it provides "best path to salvation". 

His birth name was Lakshminandan Mehta. He was renamed Raichand by his parents when he was four years old. Later his name changed to its Sanskrit form, Rajchandra. Shrimad, an honorific, was added by his disciples posthumously. His disciples also refer to him as Param Krupalu Dev (Lord of the Highest Compassion).

Recollection of previous lives

Rajchandra claimed that he first attained jāti smaraṇa gnān (recollection of previous lives) at the age of seven, in 1874. In an 1890 reply to a question from Padamshibhai, his friend in Bombay, he described the incident:

This incident played a pivotal role in his perception of the world. He described his spiritual journey in one of his poems. He wrote that he advanced on the path of spirituality he had already attained in his previous life. He claimed that he developed complete resignation and detachment to his mortal body and the rest of the world in 1897. He thanked the day of the experience in one of his poems written at the age of 30. The tree he climbed no longer exists, but a monument temple with a model of the event was erected on the site.

He experienced the same when he visited the fort in Junagadh. His experiences influenced him to live a religious life.

Prodigy

Rajchandra had an exceptional memory retentiveness and recollection. He joined the school at the age of seven and half but mastered the preliminaries in calculation in just a month. In two years, he completed the study of seven grades.

At the age of eight, he started composing poems. He composed verse synopses on Ramayana and Mahabharata at the age of nine. He gained maturity in thinking and reasoning and by the age of 10 started public speaking. At the age of 11 he started writing articles in newspapers and magazines, such as in Buddhiprakash and won several prizes in essay writing competitions. He wrote a 300-stanza poem on 'a watch' at the age of 12. In 1880, he went to Rajkot to study English, but very little is known about his education there. By 1882, he had studied and mastered several subjects. He became popular as a young poet and was referred to as Kavi due to it. He occasionally visited the residence of the ruler of Kutch as a writer and was praised for his penmanship. He started attending his father's shop at age of 13. He composed many poems on the lives of Rama and Krishna while managing the shop.

Later life

Avadhāna

Avadhāna is a difficult test of attention and recollection in which a person attends multiple objects and activities at a time. In 1884, Rajchandra came from Vavania to Morbi where he saw Shastri Shankarlal M. Bhatt performing eight Avadhāna at a time. Gattulalji Maharaj was performing the same in Bombay. He saw the performance and quickly picked it up. Just two days after the performance, he performed it in front of his friends and later in public. Initially he performed 12 Avadhāna in public in Morbi but later he performed 16 Avadhāna in audience of two thousand in Wadhwan, which was praised in newspapers. He performed 52 Avadhāna in Botad in a private meeting with his friend Harilal Shivalal Sheth which included playing Chopat game with three players; playing cards with three players; playing chess; keeping count of the sound of a small gong; mentally computing arithmetic sums involving addition, subtraction, multiplication and division (4); keeping count of the movement of beads along a thread; solving eight new problems; composing verses on eight diverse topics selected at the time and in the specific metre chosen by various members of the audience (16); rearranging 400 words of various languages spoken in random order including Greek, English, Sanskrit, Hindi, Arabic, Latin, Urdu, Gujarati, Marathi, Bengali, Maru, Jadeji, in the right order of subject, predicate (16); teaching a student; contemplating various figures of speech (2); all at one time.

He performed śatāvadhāna (100 Avadhāna) at Sir Framji Cowasji Institute in Bombay on 22 January 1887, which gained him praise and publicity. He was awarded gold medals by institutes and public for his performances as well as title of 'Sakshat Saraswati' (Incarnation of the Goddess of Knowledge). Rajchandra believed that the publicity gained by such Avadhānas may become an obstacle in spiritual pursuits, so he gradually discouraged the performances and stopped it completely by age of 20. The performances attracted wide coverage in national newspapers. In September 1893, when in Chicago, Virchand Gandhi mentioned this feat at the Parliament of the World's Religions.

Last years

In 1887 (Maha Sud 12, VS 1944), Rajchandra married Zabakben, daughter of Popatlal, the elder brother of Revashankar Jagjivandas Mehta, a Zaveri merchant family. He then engaged in the pearl and diamond business. They had two sons and two daughters. His in-laws wanted him to move to Bombay and establish business there, but he was interested in his spiritual pursuits.

In 1890 (VS 1947), he experienced self-realization for the first time at Uttarsanda where he was meditating under a mango tree near a lake. The tree no longer exists but a memorial shrine dedicated to the event is built there. He continued his householder life for more six years and was successful in his business.

He is well known as a spiritual guide of Mahatma Gandhi. They were introduced in Mumbai in 1891 and had various conversations through letters while Gandhi was in South Africa. Gandhi noted his impression of Shrimad Rajchandra in his autobiography, The Story of My Experiments with Truth, calling him his "guide and helper" and his "refuge in moments of spiritual crisis". He advised Gandhi to be patient and to study Hinduism deeply. His teaching directly influenced Gandhi's non-violence philosophy.

He stayed in Gujarat with his disciples and avoided moving to Bombay. He retired from householder life and business when he was thirty. He spent three months in Idar where he instructed seven monks in religious discourses sitting on a stone, pudhvi śila. A memorial temple and a prayer hall was later built there.

During his final years, he suffered a chronic digestive disorder. No specific cause of death was identified except extreme weakness. In 1900, he lost a large amount of weight. He was under medical supervision, and doctors advised him to move to coastal region of Gujarat for the benefit of his health. He contracted an illness during his stay in Dharampur, Gujarat, from which he never recovered. In 1901, he, his mother and wife stayed at Aga Khan's bungalow in Ahmedabad before moving to Wadhwan Camp. He died on 9 April 1901 (Chaitra Vad 5, VS 1957) in Rajkot (now in Gujarat) surrounded by his family, friends and disciples. A small photograph taken after his death is displayed in a library in Khambhat established by him. The room where he died is now a prayer hall.

Works

Rajchandra wrote Stri Niti Bodhaka (The Nature of Ideal Moral Life for Women, 1884) in which he had advocated women's education as essential to national freedom. Sad-bodh-shatak (1884) is his work on ethical topics. Mokshamala (1887) is about Jainism and self-liberation written in an easy style understandable to young people. Due to delay in the publication of Mokshamala, he composed Bhavna Bodh for his readers. It was a small book of fifty pages in which he gave instructions to cultivate 12 sentiments to lead the life of non-attachment. He had composed Namiraja, a work of five thousand verses explaining the nature of the four purusharthas. In Shurvir Smarana (1885), Rajchandra described the brave warriors of the past and compared them with their descendants who are not able to free India from British dominance.

In Atma Siddhi, a Gujarati short verse poem, he propounds six fundamental truths on soul which are also known as satapada (six steps). He lays special emphasis on right perception (samyaktva), personal efforts and a true teacher's guidance in the path to self-realisation. It is a summary of his interpretation of Jainism. It is adapted in a musical bhajan form by Shefali Shah. It is translated in English several times;  the first by J. L. Jaini in 1923. Its popular translation was published by Brahmachari Govardhandas in 1957.

He wrote more than 900 letters which charts his spiritual journey and teachings to disciples. He also edited a newspaper, Vairagya Vilas.

Shrimad Rajchandra Vachanamrut is a collection of his complete works including letters and other writings.

His several poems are popular including "Apoorva Avsar Evo Kyare Aavshe..", "Mool Marg Sambhlo Jinno Re..", "Bina Nayan Pavey Nahi..", "Hey Prabhu! Hey Prabhu! Shu Kahu..", "Yam Niyam Sanjam Aap Kiyo..", "Ichche Chhe Je Jogijan..". "Apoorva Avsar Evo Kyare Aavshe.." and "Hey Prabhu! Hey Prabhu! Shu Kahu.." were Mahatma Gandhi's favourite bhajans and were included in the Ashram Bhajanavali.

Translation and commentaries

Rajchandra wrote 51 quotes on Samyati Dharma (the religion of monk) as described in Dasha Vaikalika Siddhanta (VS 1945). It is Gujarati rendering of the original Magadhi text. He also wrote commentary on Moksha Siddhanta (VS 1953). He incompletely translated Chidanandji's Swarodayagyan. He wrote an incomplete commentary on Chauvisi of Anandghan.  In his three letters (No. 393, 394 and 395 printed in "Shrimad Rajchandra Vachanamrut"), he commented on one of the couplets of sixth out of the eight perspective, Ath Yogdrashtini Sajjhaya composed by Yashovijaya. He wrote equivalent Gujarati translation of the first 100 verses of Atmanushasan. He wrote on three Bhavna or Contemplations (Anitya, Asharan and a little on Sansara Bhavna) out of 12 Bhavna described in Shri Ratnakarand Shravakaachar. He completely translated Panchastikaya of Kundakunda. He had prepared an index on the Pragnavabodh (VS 1956).

Legacy

Rajchandra was inspired by works of Kundakunda and Digambara mystical tradition and, in turn, inspired several spiritual teachers and followers including people from all schools of Jainism. His followers sometimes consider his teaching as a new path of Jainism, neither Svetambara nor Digambara, and revere him as a saint. His path is sometimes referred as Raj Bhakta Marg, Kavipanth, or Shrimadia, which has mostly lay followers as was Rajchandra himself. His teachings influenced Kanji Swami, Dada Bhagwan, Rakesh Jhaveri, Saubhagbhai, Lalluji Maharaj (Laghuraj Swami), Atmanandji and several other religious figures. Some of them established temples and institutions in his dedication and to spread his teachings. Such temples often house his pictures and images based on photographs taken in a studio in various meditation postures just a month before his death. Shrimad Rajchandra's teachings have been popular in the Jain diaspora communities; mostly in East Africa, the United Kingdom and North America.

A special cover featuring him and Rabindranath Tagore was published by the India Post on occasion of Gandhi Jayanti in 2002.

The Government of India released 10 coins, 150 souvenir coins and the stamps at the Sabarmati Ashram in Ahmedabad on 29 June 2017 as the commemoration of Shrimad Rajchandra's 150th birth anniversary. U.C. Riverside's College of Humanities, Arts and Social Sciences and the Department of Religious Studies announced the establishment the Shrimad Rajchandra Endowed Chair in Jain Studies on 17 February 2017.

Shrimad Rajchandra Mission Dharampur is a spiritual movement inspired from Shrimad Rajchandra. It was founded by Pujya Gurudevshri Rakeshji - a devotee of Shrimadji. It is headquartered in Dharampur, Gujarat and carries out social and spiritual activities across five continents.

A 34-feet idol of Rajchandra was inaugurated in November 2017 at Shrimad Rajchandra Ashram, Dharampur by Rakesh Jhaveri and Sri Sri Ravishankar.

In popular culture

In 2007, Apurva Avsar, a biographical play on Shrimad Rajchandra in Gujarati, was produced by Manoj Shah. A Gujarati play entitled Yugpurush: Mahatma na Mahatma depicting the spiritual relationship between Shrimad Rajchandra and Mahatma Gandhi was produced by Shrimad Rajchandra Mission, Dharampur, in November 2016. An animated biographical Gujarati film Shrimad Rajchandra directed by Bhairav Kothari was released in 2021. 

On 4 August, 2022 PM Modi has inaugurated various projects in Dharampur including a hospital and women and childcare center which will be named after him.

Notes and references

Notes

References

Sources

Further reading

 Atma-Siddhi : In Search of the Soul published by Vakils Feffer & Simons
 Vachanamrut, the complete works of Shrimad Rajchandra in Gujarati, including letters and writings
Bhavana Bodh by Shrimad Rajchandra

Mahatma Gandhi
1867 births
1901 deaths
People from Rajkot
Indian Jain monks
19th-century Indian Jains
19th-century Jain monks
19th-century Indian monks
19th-century Indian philosophers
Jain philosophy
Scholars of Jainism
People from Morbi district
Gujarati-language writers
Jain reformers